Hyalurga cinctella is a moth of the family Erebidae. It was described by Strand in 1911. It is found in Ecuador.

References

Hyalurga
Moths described in 1911